Rostislav Yevgenyevich Vargashkin (born 2 June 1933) is a retired Russian cyclist who competed at the 1956 and 1960 Summer Olympics. In 1956 he finished last in the 2000 m tandem sprint, due to a crash during a repechage round, whereas in 1960 he won a bronze medal in the 1000 m track time trial. He set five world records: in the 200 m time trial from a flying start (1955 – 11.40) and in the 1000 m time trial, from a standing start (1953 – 1:10.40, 1954 – 1:10.20, 1955 – 1:09.50) and from a flying start (1955 – 1:06.0).
 
Nationally, he won 13 titles between 1953 and 1963 in the sprint, tandem sprint, team pursuit and time trial.

After retirement he became the head coach of the Russian Cycling Federation. He prepared the Soviet team for the 1964, 1968, 1972 and 1976 Olympics, and was a member of the European and world cycling federations (1993) and the president of the Soviet cycling federation (1989–1996). Vargashkin holds three bicycle-related patents (1981, 1990, 1998) and is the author of one book on time trial cycling (1961). He was twice awarded the Order of the Badge of Honour.

References

1933 births
Living people
Sportspeople from Ulaanbaatar
Soviet male cyclists
Olympic cyclists of the Soviet Union
Cyclists at the 1956 Summer Olympics
Cyclists at the 1960 Summer Olympics
Olympic bronze medalists for the Soviet Union
Olympic medalists in cycling
Medalists at the 1960 Summer Olympics